Gherasim is a Romanian male given name and surname that may refer to:

Gherasim Luca
Gherasim Rudi
Gherasim Safirin
Alina Gherasim, Romanian runner
Arcadie Gherasim
Daniel Gherasim, Romanian footballer

Romanian masculine given names
Romanian-language surnames